Attorney General Harlan may refer to:

James Harlan (Kentucky politician) (1800–1863), Attorney General of Kentucky
John Marshall Harlan (1833–1911), Attorney General of Kentucky